The 1997–98 Deutsche Eishockey Liga season was the 4th season of the Deutsche Eishockey Liga.

Adler Mannheim became the DEL Champion for the second time in a row, winning a German title for the third time in their history. The season had its share of instability. After the 15th regular season round, the Kaufbeurer Adler were insolvent and the Düsseldorfer EG left the league after season end.

Regular season 
As in the previous season two rounds/phases were played. In the first round, all teams played one home and one away game with each other for a total of 28 rounds. The first 6 placed teams continued playing for the playoff placements ). The 9 last placed teams had to fight it out for the last 2 playoff spots.

Phase I 

GP = Games, W = Win, T = Tie, L = Loss, OTL = Overtime loss, GF:GA = Goals For : Goals Against
 = Continue play for playoff spots,  = Continue qualifications for last 2 playoff spots,  = Disqualified

Phase II - "Meisterrunde" 

GP = Games, W = Win, T = Tie, L = Loss, OTL = Overtime loss, GF:GA = Goals For : Goals Against

Phase II 
Two teams qualified for the playoff spots 7 and 8.

GP = Games, W = Win, T = Tie, L = Loss, OTL = Overtime loss, GF:GA = Goals For : Goals Against
Color code:  = Playoff  = Season end

Round 1 Playoff Qualifications 
The first round of playoff qualifications was played as a best-of-five series.

OT = Overtime; SO = Shootout

Round 2 Playoff Qualifications 
The second round of playoff qualifications was played as a best-of-three series.

OT = Overtime; SO = Shootout

The Hannover Scorpions and  Krefeld Pinguine qualified for the playoffs.

Playoff 
The playoffs were played in a best-of-five format.

Quarterfinals 

OT = Overtime; SO = Shootout

Semifinals 

OT = Overtime; SO = Shootout

Finals 

OT = Overtime; SO = Shootout

With the last game, the Adler Mannheim became repeat DEL Champion and won the German Champion title for the 3rd time in the club history.

Player awards

References

1
Ger
Deutsche Eishockey Liga seasons